The Howth 17 is a type of keelboat. It was designed in 1897 and launched in Ireland in 1898. It is the oldest one-design keelboat racing class in the world and it is still racing today to its original design.

History
The original plan of the Howth 17 class was drawn by W. Herbert Boyd in 1897 for Howth Sailing Club. It was designed for local conditions that many of the keel-less boats of that era such as the 'Half-Rater' would have found difficult. They were built by John Hilditch at Carrickfergus, County Antrim in what is now Northern Ireland. Initially five boats were constructed by him and sailed the 90 mile passage to Howth in the spring of 1898.

The original fleet of five, Rita, Leila, Silver Moon, Aura and Hera, was increased in 1900 with the addition of Pauline, Zaida and Anita. 

By 1913 the class had increased to fourteen boats. The extra nine were commissioned by Dublin Bay Sailing Club for racing from Kingstown (Dún Laoghaire) - Echo, Sylvia, Mimosa, Deilginis, Rosemary, Gladys, Bobolink, Eileen and Nautilus. Gradually the boats found their way to Howth from various places, including the Solent and by the latter part of the 20th century they were all based there.

The class however was reduced to 15 due to mishaps and storm damage for a few short years but in May 1988 Isobel and Erica were launched at Howth Yacht Club, the boats having been built in a shed at Howth Castle - the first of the class actually built in Howth. 

A project to build another boat by Wicklow-based builder Charlie Featherstone was completed in May 2009 with the assistance and contribution of various members within the class as well as the vital assistance of Offaly based boat-builder Dougal McMahon whose skills were sought to complete the decks and attach the 16 hundredweight (812kg) keel. The boat was named 'Sheila' after Shelagh Wilkinson, widow of Norman Wilkinson who was the sixth owner of 'Leila' for 51 years from 1948 to 1999. The boat was launched on 23 May 2009.

Design
The plans of the Howth 17 class were originally drawn by W. Herbert Boyd in 1897 for Howth Sailing Club. In 1907 the class was also adopted by Dublin Bay Sailing Club, when agreed class rules were finalised. However, it was not until 1921 that these plans were first published in the Journal of the Humber Yawl Club in Yorkshire. By that time, the designer had succeeded his father and assumed the title of Sir Walter H. Boyd.

The design was evolved from the need for a 3-man single-design keelboat to race in the waters off Howth and Dublin Bay and it would replace Boyd's 'Half Rater' design. It was also considered that the boat might be sailed single-handed.
The basic specification was for a stem and keel of oak and elm, deadwood and frames of oak, planking of yellow pine above the waterline and red pine below, a shelf of pitch pine and a topstrake of teak, larch deck-beams and yellow pine planking and Baltic spruce spars with a keel of lead. Other than the inclusion of teak, the boats were designed to be built of materials which at that time were readily available. However today yellow pine and pitch pine are scarce, their properties of endurance and longevity much appreciated and very much in evidence on the original five boats.

Philosophy
The Class is raced and maintained by the Association Members preserving the unique heritage of the Howth 17s. Association Members maintain the vibrancy of the Class by racing and cruising together as a class and also encourage new participants to the Class in order to maintain succession. This philosophy is taken account of and explained when the boats are sold.

References

External links
Howth 17

Keelboats
Sailing ships of Ireland